Panagaeini is a tribe of ground beetles in the family Carabidae. There are more than 20 genera and 300 described species in Panagaeini.

Genera
These 22 genera belong to the tribe Panagaeini:

 Adischissus Fedorenko, 2015
 Bascanus Péringuey, 1896
 Calathocosmus Emden, 1928
 Cintaroa Kasahara, 1989
 Cintaromorpha Häckel & Anichtchenko, 2016
 Coptia Brullé, 1835
 Craspedophorus Hope, 1838
 Dischissus Bates, 1873
 Epigraphodes Basilewsky, 1967
 Epigraphus Chaudoir, 1869
 Euschizomerus Chaudoir, 1850
 Geobius Dejean, 1831
 Micrixys LeConte, 1854
 Microschemus Andrewes, 1940
 Panagaeus Latreille, 1802
 Paregraphus Basilewsky, 1967
 Peronomerus Schaum, 1854
 Psecadius Alluaud, 1911
 Tefflus Leach in Samouelle, 1819
 Tinoderus Chaudoir, 1879
 Tinognathus Chaudoir, 1879
 Trichisia Motschulsky, 1865

References

Panagaeinae